

A

B

C

D

E

F

G

H

See also 

 List of electronic music record labels
 List of independent UK record labels
List of Bangladeshi record labels

External links 
45cat.com - record labels listed by country
discogs.com - searchable by label
russian-records.com - Russian labels